Sultan Mahomed Haji Dideh (Somali: Xaaji Diide), also known as Haggi Diideh was  Sultan of Zeila of the former Ifat and Adal Kingdom.

History
As is shown in "Morin" (2005),  the name of former Djibouti , “Cote Francaise des Somalis” is said to have been proposed by Mohamed Haji Dide of the Mahad 'Ase, Bahabar Celi branch of the Gadabuursi. He came on to build the first Mosque in Djibouti "Gami ar-Rahma" in 1891.

References

Djiboutian Muslims

Gadabuursi